Inner Brass Island is a 130-acre undeveloped tropical Caribbean island, situated 0.4 miles north off the Nordside of Saint Thomas in the United States Virgin Islands. There is a resort site located here, along with white sandy beaches, tropical reefs, and also a helicopter pad. It is reached by boat or kayaking from St. Thomas' north shore.

References 

Islands of the United States Virgin Islands
Northside, Saint Thomas, U.S. Virgin Islands